Cestocampa is a genus of two-pronged bristletails in the family Campodeidae. There are at least four described species in Cestocampa.

Species
These four species belong to the genus Cestocampa:
 Cestocampa balcanica Conde, 1955 g
 Cestocampa gasparoi Bareth, 1988 g
 Cestocampa iberica Sendra & Conde g
 Cestocampa italica (Silvestri, 1912) g
Data sources: i = ITIS, c = Catalogue of Life, g = GBIF, b = Bugguide.net

References

Further reading

 
 
 

Diplura